Ernesto Domínguez Hernández (born 9 March 1941 in Móra d'Ebre, Tarragona, Catalonia) is a Spanish retired footballer who played as a forward.

External links

National team data 

1941 births
Living people
People from Ribera d'Ebre
Sportspeople from the Province of Tarragona
Spanish footballers
Footballers from Catalonia
Association football forwards
La Liga players
Segunda División players
CD Condal players
RCD Espanyol footballers
Levante UD footballers
RCD Mallorca players
Spain youth international footballers
Spain B international footballers
Spain international footballers
Catalonia international footballers